Ankhi Alamgir is a Bangladeshi singer and actress. She won the Bangladesh National Film Award for Best Child Artist for her performance in the film Bhat De (1984) and Best Female Playback Singer for the film Ekti Cinemar Golpo (2018). As of 2016, she has released 18 albums. She is the daughter of actor-director Alamgir.

Career
Alamgir debuted singing playback in 1994. Her first album was launched in 1997 and the second one, titled Bisher Kata in 1998.

Alamgir emceed a reality television show Power Voice.

Alamgir returned to acting as an adult through a television drama serial in mid-2010. She performed as a guest actor in the film Ek Cup Cha (2014).

Award
National Award recipient as “Best Child Artist” in 1984, which was awarded by President of Bangladesh.
National Award recipient as “Best Female Singer” in 2018, which was awarded by the Prime Minister of Bangladesh.
Bangladesh Film Journalist Organizations’ ‘‘Best Female Playback Singer’’ in the years 2000,2005 and 2018.

References

External links

Living people
20th-century Bangladeshi women singers
20th-century Bangladeshi singers
Bangladeshi film actresses
Bangladeshi playback singers
Bangladeshi television personalities
Best Child Artist National Film Award (Bangladesh) winners
Best Female Playback Singer National Film Award (Bangladesh) winners
Date of birth missing (living people)
Place of birth missing (living people)
Year of birth missing (living people)